Edward Frederick James (born 14 May 1947) is a British scholar of medieval history and science fiction. He is Emeritus Professor of Medieval History at University College, Dublin. James received the Hugo Award for his non-fiction book The Cambridge Companion to Science Fiction (co-edited with Farah Mendlesohn), and the Pilgrim Award for lifetime contribution to SF and fantasy scholarship.

Biography

James was born in Solihull, Warwickshire. He attended the Solihull School and read Modern History at St John's College, Oxford (1965-1968). He completed postgraduate work at the Institute of Archaeology, Oxford, 1968-1970, supervised by Professor Christopher Hawkes. James was awarded D.Phil in 1975, for a thesis entitled ‘South-West Gaul from the fifth to the eighth century: the contribution of archaeology’. He began teaching in 1970 at University College, Dublin.

He was a lecturer at the Department of Medieval History in University College Dublin from 1970 to 1978. He was a lecturer in early medieval history at the Department of History, University of York, 1978 to 1995, as well as Director of the Centre for Medieval Studies, University of York from 1990 to 1995.

He was Professor of Medieval History at the University of Reading from 1995 to 2004 and was a Director of the Graduate Centre for Medieval Studies, 1999–2001. He retired in 2012.

Recognition
James is the recipient of the 2004 Pilgrim Award for lifetime contribution to science fiction and fantasy scholarship. He has also won the Hugo Award for Best Related Work and a BSFA Award for Best Non-Fiction, in addition to multiple nominations for individual works.

Personal life
James married his fellow academic, Farah Mendlesohn in 2001.

Selected works

 Visigothic Spain: New Approaches. Edited by James. Oxford: Clarendon Press; New York: Oxford University Press, 1980.
 The Origins of France: From Clovis to the Capetians, 500–1000. New York: St. Martin's Press, 1982. .
 The Franks. Oxford, UK: Blackwell, 1988. .
 The Profession of Science Fiction: SF Writers on their Craft and Ideas. Edited by Maxim Jakubowski and James; foreword by Arthur C. Clarke. Insights series. Macmillan UK, 1992. . New York: St. Martin's Press, 1992. (.
 Science Fiction in the Twentieth Century. Oxford: Oxford University Press, 1994. )
 The Cambridge Companion to Science Fiction. Edited by James and Farah Mendlesohn. Cambridge, U.K.: Cambridge University Press, 2003. .
 Britain in the First Millennium. London: Oxford University Press, 2001. .
 Europe's Barbarians, AD 200–600. Harlow, England: Pearson Longman, 2009. .
 A Short History of Fantasy. Farah Mendlesohn and James. London: Middlesex University Press, 2009. .
 The Cambridge Companion to Fantasy Literature. Edited by James and Farah Mendlesohn. Cambridge, U.K.: Cambridge University Press, 2012. .

Notes

References

External links 
 
 

1947 births
British medievalists
British literary critics
Science fiction academics
Hugo Award-winning editors
Academics of University College Dublin
Alumni of the University of Oxford
Academics of the University of York
Academics of the University of Reading
Living people
Male speculative fiction editors